Divsha Amirà (1899 – 9 April 1966) was an Israeli mathematician and educator.

Biography
Amirà was born in Brańsk, Russian Empire to Rivka and Aharon Itin. She immigrated to Israel with her family in 1906. Her father was one of the founders of Ahuzat Bayit (today Tel Aviv), a founder of the Tel Aviv Great Synagogue, and the owner of the first publishing house in Jaffa. She graduated in the second class of the Herzliya Gymnasium in 1914.

Amirà studied at the University of Göttingen and obtained her doctorate from the University of Geneva in 1924 under the guidance of Herman Müntz. Her doctoral thesis, published in 1925, provided a projective synthesis of Euclidean geometry.

Pedagogic career
After leaving Geneva, Amirà worked at Gymnasia Rehavia in Jerusalem, and taught several courses on geometry at the Einstein Institute of Mathematics.

Published works
Amirà published an introductory school textbook on geometry in 1938, following the axiomatic approach of Hilbert's Grundlagen der Geometrie. She published a more advanced textbook on the same topic in 1963.

See also
Education in Israel
Women in Israel

References

 

1899 births
1966 deaths
20th-century women mathematicians
Burials at Har HaMenuchot
Geometers
Academic staff of the Hebrew University of Jerusalem
Herzliya Hebrew Gymnasium alumni
Emigrants from the Russian Empire to the Ottoman Empire
Israeli mathematicians
Israeli women mathematicians
Mathematics educators
Textbook writers
University of Geneva alumni
University of Göttingen alumni